The Chiesa di San Pantaleone Martire, known as San Pantalon in the Venetian dialect, is a church in the Dorsoduro sestiere of Venice, Italy. It is located on the Campo San Pantalon (square), and is dedicated to Saint Pantaleon.

The 17th-century Chiesa di San Pantalon is a parish church of the Vicariate of San Polo-Santa Croce-Dorsoduro.

Architectural elements
San Pantalon is particularly well known for its immense ceiling painting, depicting The Martyrdom and Apotheosis of St Pantalon. It was painted on canvas by Gian Antonio Fumiani between 1680 and 1704, when he fell to his death from the scaffolding.

Other notable works include Coronation of the Virgin by Antonio Vivarini and Giovanni d'Alemagna in the Chapel of the Holy Nail and St Pantalon healing a Boy, the last work by Veronese, originally commissioned for the high altar.

Assessments of the Fumiani fresco
Modern critics note that the dramatic sotto in su canvas marks the entry of Bolognese quadratura to Venice; Fumiani had studied with the perspective painter Domenico degli Ambrogi.

John Ruskin, in his typical disdain of all post-Quattrocento works, described the ceiling fresco as a: 

John Crowley's novel The Solitudes, his first volume in the Ægypt series, has an extended response to the painting.

References

External links 

 Satellite image from Google Maps

Roman Catholic churches in Venice
Dorsoduro
17th-century Roman Catholic church buildings in Italy